Christian Bernreiter (born 7 April 1964 in Straubing) is a German engineer and politician of the Christian Social Union (CSU) who has been serving as State Ministe for Housing, Construction and Transport in the cabinet of Minister President Markus Söder since 2022.

Other activities
 Federal Network Agency for Electricity, Gas, Telecommunications, Posts and Railway (BNetzA), Alternate Member of the Rail Infrastructure Advisory Council (since 2021)

See also
List of Bavarian Christian Social Union politicians

References

Christian Social Union in Bavaria politicians
1964 births
Living people